Verticillium albo-atrum var. menthae is a plant pathogen infecting mint.

See also 
 List of mint diseases

References

External links
 Index Fungorum
 USDA ARS Fungal Database

Fungal plant pathogens and diseases
Mint diseases
Hypocreales incertae sedis
Fungi described in 1950